Andronymus fenestrella is a butterfly in the family Hesperiidae. It is found in Cameroon, the Democratic Republic of the Congo, Uganda, Malawi and northern Zambia. The habitat consists of forests.

References

Butterflies described in 1908
Erionotini